Ernest Fox Nichols (June 1, 1869 – April 29, 1924) was an American educator and physicist. He served as the 10th President of Dartmouth College.

Early life
Nichols was born in Leavenworth County, Kansas, and received his undergraduate degree from Kansas State University in 1888.  After working for a year in the Chemistry Department at Kansas State, he matriculated to graduate school at Cornell University, where he received degrees in 1893 and 1897.  He also studied at the University of Berlin and Cambridge University.

Nichols served as a professor of physics at Colgate University from 1892 to 1898, at Dartmouth College from 1898 to 1903, and Columbia University from 1903 to 1909. He served as the President of Dartmouth College from 1909 to 1916 and as the president of MIT from 1921 until 1922. However, he was too ill from heart disease during his brief tenure to enter actively into his responsibilities.

Nichols was awarded the Rumford Prize by the American Academy of Arts and Sciences in 1905 for his proof that light exerts pressure.  He was also elected Vice President of the National Academy of Sciences. He was adviser of numerous outstanding scientists in Columbia University including Frederic Columbus Blake. His PhD adviser was Edward Leamington Nichols.

Dartmouth presidency
The appointment of Ernest Fox Nichols as the 10th president in the Wheelock Succession could be seen as both a reflection of the times and a tribute to the quality of Dartmouth's faculty. A member of the physics department and its chair at the time of his appointment, Nichols' pioneering work in the measurement of radiation expanded the frontiers of knowledge at the end of the 19th century. He was the first Dartmouth president since John Wheelock who was not a member of the clergy, yet his deep appreciation of the importance of broad-based scholarship to the moral and spiritual growth of students was internationally recognized.

Many of the college's most cherished institutions and traditions took shape during the Nichols administration, including the Dartmouth Outing Club and Winter Carnival. In addition, to improve communications between Dartmouth and its growing body of graduates, President Nichols established the Dartmouth Council of Alumni.

Ernest Fox Nichols stepped down in 1916 to become a professor of physics at Yale University and subsequently became president of the Massachusetts Institute of Technology. Posted with Permission from Dartmouth College

See also
Nichols radiometer

References

Sources

External links
 President of Dartmouth College
 Dartmouth College
 Wheelock Succession

 

1869 births
1924 deaths
People from Leavenworth, Kansas
Kansas State University alumni
Cornell University alumni
Presidents of Dartmouth College
Dartmouth College faculty
Presidents of the Massachusetts Institute of Technology
Members of the United States National Academy of Sciences
Scientists from Kansas